Webber Island is the large central island (between Olson Island and Chandler Island) of the White Islands in southern Sulzberger Bay. It is rudely delineated on the map of the Byrd Antarctic Expedition, 1928–30, and indicated as "low ice cliffs" that rise above the ice shelf in this part of the bay. Mapped in detail by United States Geological Survey (USGS) from surveys and U.S. Navy air photos, 1959–65. Named for James Webber, United States Antarctic Research Program (USARP) ionospheric physicist at Byrd Station, 1968–69 season.

See also 
 List of antarctic and sub-antarctic islands

Islands of the Ross Dependency
King Edward VII Land